Desticius is a Roman nomen.

 Titus Desticius Juba, governor in Roman Britain, 250s
 Titus Desticius Severus, governor in Raetia c. 166